Jean-Louis Leca (born 21 September 1985) is a French professional footballer who plays as a goalkeeper for Ligue 1 club RC Lens. He has previously represented the Corsica national team at international level.

Club career
Jean-Louis Leca was trained in Corsica. He played his first Ligue 1 game with Bastia in the 2004-05 season.

He joined Valenciennes in 2008. He then went back to his former club Bastia. He joined Ajaccio in 2017, after Bastia filled for bankruptcy.

In July 2018, Leca joined French club RC Lens. He played his first game on 27 July 2018 against Ligue 2 club Orléans. In December 2022, he extended his contract with Lens until 2024.

References

External links
 
 

1985 births
Living people
Sportspeople from Bastia
French footballers
Footballers from Corsica
Association football goalkeepers
Corsica international footballers
SC Bastia players
Valenciennes FC players
AC Ajaccio players
RC Lens players
Ligue 1 players
Ligue 2 players